Moon of the Wolf is an American TV movie broadcast on September 26, 1972 on ABC Movie of the Week. It stars David Janssen, Barbara Rush, Geoffrey Lewis and Bradford Dillman, with a script by Alvin Sapinsley (based on Leslie H. Whitten's novel of the same name). The film was directed by Daniel Petrie and filmed on location in Burnside, Louisiana. All of the downtown footage was from Clinton, Louisiana.

Plot
In the Louisiana Bayou town of Marsh Island, two farmers (Royal Dano, John Davis Chandler) discover the mauled, dead body of a local young woman. Sheriff Aaron Whitaker (David Janssen) is called. The victim's temperamental brother Lawrence Burrifors (Geoffrey Lewis) arrives at the crime scene and jumps to the conclusion that the girl's lover committed the murder, a man whose name her brother does not know. The town's Dr. Drutan (John Beradino) examines the body and concludes that the girl died from a blow to the head.

The sheriff investigates the crime and local residents have a variety of theories, including the belief she was killed by wild dogs. A posse forms to track down the wild dogs with little success. Burrifors continues to insist the killer to be his sister's mysterious lover while the sheriff, in turn, is suspicious of him. The girl's sick and dying father Hugh Burrifors, interviewed by the sheriff, warns him of the Loug Garog. The sheriff does not understand the French term.

The sheriff's investigation soon takes him to the plantation home of the wealthy Andrew Rodanthe (Bradford Dillman) and his sister Louise (Barbara Rush). They are the last of a local family dynasty. Andrew, who the sheriff suspects had an affair with the victim, claims to have been suffering an attack of malaria the night the girl was killed.

The sheriff, suspicious of the temperamental brother Lawrence after he assaults the town doctor, who turns out to be the mysterious lover, puts him in jail. While there, the full moon rises again, and Lawrence and the sheriff's deputy are killed in a vicious attack after the steel bars of the cell are torn from the wall.

With the town's residents fearful and the sheriff without assistance, Andrew Rodanthe volunteers to become deputy. Andrew and the sheriff return to Hugh Burrifor's house and discover the old man has created a voodoo potion that gives off a vapor meant to repel the Loug Garog. Rodanthe inhales the potion and goes into what appears to be an epileptic seizure. He is taken to the hospital.

While there, Andrew's sister Louise tells the sheriff she can speak French fluently and would talk to Hugh Burrifor about the unexplainable term Loug Garog. While speaking with the old man, Louise solves the puzzle. Loug Garog is a mispronunciation of Loup Garou. Translated into English the term means werewolf.

Transformed into a werewolf, Andrew violently escapes the hospital and becomes the subject of a manhunt. As a posse gathers, Louise runs to the mayor, telling him that her brother is sick and that there are drugs that can help him. At her and Andrew's home, Louise talks to Sheriff Whitaker about werewolf folklore. She reveals a family secret, that her grandfather used to suffer from unusual spells of sickness, implying he was a werewolf and Andrew's curse was inherited.

Louise returns to her plantation home alone, and Andrew, still in his werewolf form, enters the house. Louise flees to the barn. When the werewolf follows, she attempts to set him afire, then returns to the house. Andrew escapes the fire and pursues Louise. She eventually shoots him just as the sheriff returns. After he dies, Andrew returns to his human form.

Cast
 David Janssen as Sheriff Aaron Whitaker
 Barbara Rush as Louise Rodanthe
 Bradford Dillman as Andrew Rodanthe
 John Beradino as Dr. Druten
 Geoffrey Lewis as Lawrence
 Royal Dano as Tom Gurmandy Sr.
 John Davis Chandler as Tom Gurmandy Jr.
 Claudia McNeil as Sara
 Robert Phillips as Deputy
 Dick Crockett as Attendant
 Paul R. Deville as Hugh

See also
 List of films in the public domain in the United States

References

External links 
 
 
 

ABC Movie of the Week
American independent films
1970s monster movies
American horror television films
American werewolf films
Films directed by Daniel Petrie
1972 television films
1972 horror films
1972 films
Films scored by Bernardo Segall
Films based on American horror novels
Films produced by Edward S. Feldman
1970s English-language films
1970s American films